SACD may stand for:

Super Audio CD, a form of digital audio storage
Société des Auteurs et Compositeurs Dramatiques, a French society representing authors and their work

 Storage Array Control Device, a Hewlett-Packard term 
 SAC-D, Argentine satellite
Subacute combined degeneration of spinal cord, caused by vitamin B12 deficiency